The 2009 Tippeligaen was the 65th completed season of top division football in Norway. The competition began on 15 March and end on 1 November. Stabæk were the defending champions. Odd Grenland, Sandefjord and Start entered as the three promoted teams from the 2008 1. divisjon. They replaced HamKam who were relegated to the 2009 1. divisjon.

Overview

League expansion
This was the first top division seasons where 16 teams were competing on the highest level of Norwegian football since the 1961–62 Hovedserien season. Due to the league expanding from 14 to 16 teams, three teams were promoted from the 1. divisjon at the end of the 2008 season. Those teams were champions Odd Grenland, runners-up Sandefjord and third-placed Start. The last spot was taken by Aalesund after winning a two-legged play-off match against Sogndal.

Summary
Stabæk was the defending champions, having won their first ever League Championship in 2008. On 27 September, Rosenborg secured the title with four rounds left to go. They won their 21st top-flight title.

Teams

Stadiums and locations

''Note: Table lists in alphabetical order.

Personnel and kits

Managerial changes

League table

Results

Relegation play-offs 

At the end of the season, the two last teams relegated directly to 1. divisjon, and were replaced by the winner and runner-up of the 1. divisjon who were directly promoted.

Four teams entered a play-off for the last Tippeligaen spot in the 2010 season. These were:
 A) Fredrikstad (14th placed team in the Tippeligaen)
 B) Kongsvinger (Third placed team in the 1. divisjon)
 C) Sogndal (Fourth placed team in the 1. divisjon)
 D) Sarpsborg 08 (Fifth placed team in the 1. divisjon)

Season statistics

Top scorers 

Source: AltOmFotball.no

Discipline

Player
Most yellow cards: 7
 Marciano (Sandefjord)
 Ebrima Sohna (Sandefjord)
 Kasey Wehrman (Fredrikstad/Lyn)
Most red cards: 2
 Demar Phillips (Aalesund)

Club
Most yellow cards: 54
Strømsgodset

Most red cards: 3
Lyn
Sandefjord
Start
Tromsø

Attendance 

Last updated: End of 2009 seasonSource: altomfotball.no

Other

See also 
 2009 1. divisjon
 2009 in Norwegian football
 2009 Norwegian Football Cup

References 

Eliteserien seasons
1
Norway
Norway